Toshiyuki Watanabe (渡辺 俊幸 Watanabe Toshiyuki) (born February 3, 1955, in Nagoya, Japan) is a Japanese musician and composer who has scored multiple films and anime. His most notable works are the Mothra trilogy in the 1990s and the award-winning anime series "Uchū Kyōdai" ("Space Brothers") from 2012 to 2014. He is the son of legendary tokusatsu and anime composer, Michiaki Watanabe.

Notable film scores

 Declaration of a Domineering Husband (1979)
 Fine Snow (1983)
 Jiro's Story (1987)
 Golf Yoakemae (1987)
 Rebirth of Mothra (1996)
 Rebirth of Mothra II (1997)
 Rebirth of Mothra III (1998)
 Milk White (2003)
 Gege (2004)
 Mazinger Z: Infinity (2017)
 Shinkansen Henkei Robo Shinkalion the Movie: Mirai Kara Kita Shinsoku no ALFA-X (2019)

Television scores
 "Round Vernian Vifam" (1983-1999)
 Bosco Adventure (1986-1987)
 Metal Armor Dragonar (1987-1988) (with Kentarō Haneda)
 The Adventures of Peter Pan (1989)
 The Three-Eyed One (1990-1991)
 The Brave Fighter of Sun Fighbird (1991-1992)
 Mōri Motonari (1997)
 Kyuukyuu Sentai GoGoFive (1999-2000)
 Galactic Armored Fleet Majestic Prince (2013)
 Space Brothers (2012-2014)
 Kabukimono Keiji (2015)
 Shinkansen Henkei Robo Shinkalion THE ANIMATION (2018-2019)

Video game scores
Shenmue (1999) (orchestration)
Chase the Express (2000)
Shenmue II (2001) (orchestration)

Sources

References

External links
Official website

Toshiyuki Watanabe at MobyGames

1955 births
Japanese film score composers
Japanese male film score composers
Japanese male musicians
Japanese musicians
Living people
Musicians from Aichi Prefecture
People from Nagoya